Lubiszyn  is a village in Gorzów County, Lubusz Voivodeship, in western Poland. It is the seat of the gmina (administrative district) called Gmina Lubiszyn.

The village has a population of 800.

References

Villages in Gorzów County